Lance Eric Pitlick (born November 5, 1967) is an American former professional ice hockey player. He played in the NHL with the Ottawa Senators and Florida Panthers.

Playing career
Pitlick graduated from Robbinsdale Cooper High School in New Hope, Minnesota in 1986. He was drafted by his hometown Minnesota North Stars in the 9th round, 180th overall in the 1986 NHL Entry Draft. After being drafted, he played for the University of Minnesota for four years, providing a strong defensive presence for the Golden Gophers. Pitlick was the University of Minnesota team Captain during the 1989–90 season.

After college, Pitlick was signed by the Philadelphia Flyers and played with their minor league affiliate Hershey Bears of the AHL for four years. Prior to the 1994–95 season Pitlick signed with the Ottawa Senators and played the majority of the season with the Prince Edward Island Senators along with also making his NHL debut with the Senators, playing in 15 games. After splitting the 1995–96 season between the Senators and the minors Pitlick was able to stay in the NHL permanently and played another 3 years with the Senators, scoring a career high 10 points and 91 penalty minutes during the 1996–97 season. Prior to the 1999–00 season Pitlick signed with the Florida Panthers. He played 3 years with the Panthers before retiring after the 2001–02 season.

Personal
Pitlick is not the only hockey player in his family; his nephew, Tyler Pitlick, who was selected by the Edmonton Oilers in the second round (31st overall) of the 2010 NHL Entry Draft, is currently playing in the NHL with the St. Louis Blues. His elder son Rem played collegiate hockey for the University of Minnesota and is currently playing for the Montreal Canadiens of the NHL. His younger son, Rhett, plays NCAA hockey at the University of Minnesota and was drafted 131st by the Montreal Canadiens in the 2019 NHL Entry Draft.

His wife Lisa is also a former athlete. She attended the University of Minnesota and competed on Team USA's gymnastics team.

After retiring from professional hockey in 2002, Pitlick became the founder of a hockey training products business called Sweet Hockey, which was later merged with another entity to create Sniper's Edge Hockey. Pitlick and his business partner sold Sniper's Edge in 2019, but Pitlick remains an advisor to its current owner. Today operates as a hockey training professional and co-founder of onlinehockeytraining.com, and recently launched "The Hockey Journey" podcast series where he interviews influencers throughout the game of hockey. Pitlick recently interviewed CEO David Shuler of Snipers Edge Hockey as part of the podcast series.

Career statistics

Awards and honours

References

External links 

1967 births
Living people
American men's ice hockey defensemen
Florida Panthers players
Hershey Bears players
Ice hockey people from Minneapolis
Minnesota Golden Gophers men's ice hockey players
Minnesota North Stars draft picks
Ottawa Senators players
Prince Edward Island Senators players